William Charles Anderson (born May 5, 1986) is an American singer and songwriter who is best known as the lead vocalist of the American pop rock band Parachute.

Early life
Anderson was born in Sacramento, California but his family later moved to Charlottesville, Virginia. His father, Mark, is a physician and a professor of radiology and orthopaedic surgery at the University of Virginia. He has two brothers, Charles and John, and a sister, Jane. He began taking piano lessons at a young age and his parents bought him his first guitar as a Christmas present when he was eleven years old. He worked as a lifeguard in both high school and college. Anderson graduated from the University of Virginia in 2008, having majored in music.

Career
Anderson formed the band Sparky's Flaw in high school with his classmates Kit French, Johnny Stubblefield, and Alex Hargrave. He met Nate McFarland while studying at the University of Virginia; they were both members of The Virginia Gentlemen. McFarland joined the band as a lead guitarist and Sparky's Flaw released two independent EPs. They later changed their band name to Parachute. Parachute played many college shows and were signed to Mercury Records during Anderson's third year of college in 2007.

Parachute has released five albums since 2009, and has toured with artists including Switchfoot, Kelly Clarkson, NEEDTOBREATHE, Jon McLaughlin, The Script, Mat Kearney, and The Goo Goo Dolls.

Influences
In his teenage years, Anderson was a fan of Ben Folds Five, John Mayer and Dave Matthews Band: "Honestly, I think Dave Matthews Band is pretty much the reason we all wanted to be in a band. They were huge at the time we were coming together." Tragic Kingdom by No Doubt and Motorcade of Generosity by Cake were the first albums he ever bought. He has named Billy Joel, Paul Simon, Elton John, and Stevie Wonder as his top four songwriting influences, characterizing them as "classic singer-songwriters". He describes Sam Cooke as his favorite singer "of all time".

Personal life
Anderson lived in Nashville, Tennessee in from 2010 to 2016. "Everything here is about music, at least amongst my friends and I. It's fun to be in a place where everybody is thinking about writing ...  and just loves talking about it." He owns a Maltese Chihuahua mix named Eddie. In 2017, Anderson married American poet Courtney Kampa.In November 2022, his wife Courtney passed away as a result of a car accident.

References

External links
 
 Will Anderson at Twitter 

Living people
American rock singers
Musicians from Sacramento, California
1986 births
Singers from California
21st-century American singers